Bobana Klikovac (born 19 July 1995) is a Montenegrin handball player for Gloria Buzău and the Montenegrin national team.

International honours
EHF Cup: 
Winner: 2018

References

External links

 

1995 births
Living people
Sportspeople from Cetinje
Montenegrin female handball players
Montenegrin expatriate sportspeople in Hungary
Montenegrin expatriate sportspeople in Romania
Expatriate handball players
Fehérvár KC players
Ferencvárosi TC players (women's handball)